Curramore is a rural locality in the Sunshine Coast Region, Queensland, Australia. In the  Curramore had a population of 190 people.

History
Curramore State School opened on 11 August 1913 and closed in 1939.

In the  Curramore had a population of 190 people.

Attractions 
Obi Lookout is on Schultz Road.

References

Further reading 

  — includes Curramore State School

Suburbs of the Sunshine Coast Region
Localities in Queensland